Mojtaba Taghavi (born February 2, 1968) is a retired Iranian football player and a current coach. He is currently technical manager at Naft Masjed Soleyman.

Career
After the dismissal of Saipa head coach Majid Saleh in February 2012, he was appointed as the club's head coach on 1 March 2012 and signed a contract until the end of upcoming season. On 15 May 2012, Mojtaba Taghavi agreed to extend his contract with Saipa to the end of 2012–13 season. He left the team at the end of the season after finished 9th. On 1 June 2013, he signed a contract with Mes Kerman but he resigned as coach just days before the start of the new season after he was attacked by fans of his own club at a training session. On 16 December 2013, he signed a contract with Zob Ahan to become the club's head coach effective from 1 January 2014. He was sacked by the club on 25 February 2014, just two months after his appointment.

References

1968 births
Living people
Iranian football managers
Iranian footballers
Saipa F.C. players
People from Karaj
Sanat Mes Kerman F.C. managers
Association football forwards
Sanat Naft Abadan F.C. managers
Persian Gulf Pro League managers